Creggan is a townland in County Tyrone, Northern Ireland. It is situated in the historic barony of Omagh East and the civil parish of Termonmaguirk and covers an area of 4022 acres.

Popular places of tourist interest include the An Creagán centre, located three miles north of Carrickmore on the main Cookstown to Omagh road. Tourists are drawn to the old-fashioned cottages located near the An Creagán centre. 

The popular traditional folk song, The "Creggan White Hare", is named for this townland.

The population of the townland declined during the 19th century:

See also
List of townlands of County Tyrone

References

Townlands of County Tyrone
Civil parish of Termonmaguirk